"Don't Bring Flowers" is a song by Swedish singer-songwriter Erik Hassle. It was released in the United Kingdom on 23 August 2009 as the first single from his debut album, Pieces. The song peaked at number eleven in Denmark and at number twenty-five in Sweden.

Reception 
David Balls of British entertainment website Digital Spy said the song captures the greatness of Scandinavian pop music. He gave the song four stars (out of five) and wrote, "Over a minimalist-yet-epic synth backdrop, Hassle urges: "Don't bring flowers after I'm dead, save your givings for the living instead." Slightly morbid message aside, it's his vocals, unique and full of pleading innocence, that really stand out. We'll be keeping an eye on this one."

Track listing 
UK digital download #1
"Don't Bring Flowers" – 3:15
"The Thanks I Get" – 3:31

UK digital download #2
"Don't Bring Flowers" (Martin Roth NuStyle Remix) – 6:05
"Don't Bring Flowers" (Three Fingers Remix) – 5:08
"Don't Bring Flowers" (Ee-Sma Remix) – 8:20
"Don't Bring Flowers" (Plugs Remix) – 5:13

Personnel 
Mack - music, lyrics
Tysper - music, lyrics, production, recording, mixing
Grizzly - music, lyrics
Erik Hassle - music, lyrics
Björn Engelmann - mastering

Source:

Charts and certifications

Charts

Certifications

References 

2009 singles
Erik Hassle songs
Songs written by Tommy Tysper
2009 songs
Island Records singles
Songs written by Erik Hassle